The two main official languages of Finland are Finnish and Swedish. There are also several official minority languages: three variants of Sami, as well as Romani, Finnish Sign Language and Karelian.

Finnish

Finnish is the language of the majority, 86.9% of the population in 2020. It is a Finnic language closely related to Estonian and less closely to the Sami languages.

Swedish

Swedish is the main language of 5.2% of the population in 2020 (92.4% in the Åland autonomous province), down from 14% at the beginning of the 20th century. In 2012, 44% of Finnish citizens with another registered primary language than Swedish could hold a conversation in this language.
Swedish was the language of the administration until the late 19th century. Today it is one of the two main official languages, with a position equal to Finnish in most legislation, though the working language in most governmental bodies is Finnish. Both Finnish and Swedish are compulsory subjects in school with an exception for children with a third language as their native language. A successfully completed language test is a prerequisite for governmental offices where a university degree is required.

The four largest Swedish-speaking communities in Finland, in absolute numbers, are those of Helsinki, Espoo, Porvoo and Vaasa, where they constitute significant minorities. Helsinki, the capital, had a Swedish-speaking majority until late in the 19th century. Currently 5.9% of the population of Helsinki are native Swedish speakers and 15% are native speakers of languages other than Finnish and Swedish.

The Swedish dialects spoken in Finland mainland are known as Finland-Swedish. There is a rich Finland-Swedish literature, including authors such as Tove Jansson, Johan Ludvig Runeberg, Edith Södergran and Zacharias Topelius. Runeberg is considered Finland's national poet and wrote the national anthem, "Vårt land", which was only later translated to Finnish.

Within language policy making in Finland, Taxell’s paradox refers to the notion that monolingual solutions are essential to the realization of functional bilingualism, with multilingual solutions ultimately leading to monolingualism. The thinking is based on the observation of the Swedish language in environments such as schools is subordinated to the majority language Finnish for practical and social reasons, despite the positive characteristics associated with mutual language learning.

English
English is spoken by most Finns as a second language. Official statistics in 2012 show that at least 70% of Finnish people can speak English.

Sami languages
The Sami languages are a group of related languages spoken across Lapland. They are distantly related to Finnish. The three Sami languages spoken in Finland, Northern Sami, Inari Sami and Skolt Sami, have a combined native speaker population of 2,004 in 2019.

Romani
The Romani language in Finland is called Finnish Kalo. It has been spoken in Finland for roughly 450 years. It has been significantly influenced by other languages in Finland, such as Finnish. Of the around 13,000 Finnish Romani, only 30% speak and understand the language well. The number of speakers diminished drastically after WW2. Most Finnish Romani speak Finnish or Swedish in their day-to-day life. 

Finnish municipalities have the possibility to organize education in Finnish Kalo, if there are a sufficient amount of romani children to form a group. A significant challenge to this is the lack of Finnish Kalo teachers. According to the Finnish constitution, Finnish Romani have the right to practise their language and culture. The number of Romani language speakers is estimated to have decreased by 40% over the past 50 years.

Karelian
Until World War II, Karelian was spoken in the historical Border-Karelia region (Raja-Karjala) on the northeastern shore of Lake Ladoga. After the war, evacuated Karelian speakers were settled all over Finland. In 2001, the Karelian Language Society estimated that the language was understood by 11,000–12,000 people in Finland, most of whom were elderly. A more recent estimate is that there are around 5,000 first language speakers in Finland, but the size of the language community is 30,000.

Karelian was recognized in a regulation by the then president Tarja Halonen in November 2009, in accordance with the European Charter for Regional or Minority Languages.

Russian 

The Russian language is the third most spoken native language in Finland (1.6%). The Russian language has no official status in Finland, though historically it served as the third co-official language with Finnish and Swedish for a relatively brief period between 1900 and 1917.

Territorial bilingualism
All municipalities outside Åland where both official languages are spoken by either at least 8% of the population or at least 3,000 people are considered bilingual. Swedish reaches these criteria in 59 out of 336 municipalities located in Åland (where this does not matter) and the coastal areas of Ostrobothnia region, Southwest Finland (especially in Åboland outside Turku) and Uusimaa. Outside these areas there are some towns with significant Swedish-speaking minorities not reaching the criteria. Thus the inland is officially unilingually Finnish-speaking. Finnish reaches the criteria everywhere but in Åland and in three municipalities in the Ostrobothnia region, which is also the only region on the Finnish mainland with a Swedish-speaking majority (52% to 46%).

The Sami languages have an official status in the northernmost Finland, in Utsjoki, Inari, Enontekiö and part of Sodankylä, regardless of proportion of speakers.

In the bilingual municipalities signs are in both languages, important documents are translated and authorities have to be able to serve in both languages. Authorities of the central administration have to serve the public in both official languages, regardless of location, and in Sami in certain circumstances.

Places often have different names in Finnish and in Swedish, both names being equally official as name of the town. For a list, see Names of places in Finland in Finnish and in Swedish.

Statistics

93% of Finns aged 18–64 can speak a foreign language, and 78% can speak two or more. 2,184,000 or 66% can speak both Swedish and English, while 1,003,000 (30%) can speak German and English and 882,000 (27%) Swedish and German.

See also
Finland's language strife
Languages of Åland
Names of places in Finland in Finnish and in Swedish
Languages of Sweden
Languages of Norway
Languages of Denmark
Languages of Greenland

References

External links